Etorki is a firm cheese made in the French Basque country, at Mauléon-Licharre in the Pyrénées-Atlantiques department. It is made from pasteurized sheep milk and pulp pressed, not cooked, then matured for seven weeks.

Etorki is produced in ten-inch by four-inch cylinders weighing ten pounds. Cheese critics describe Etorki as "smooth, supple, and velvety."

See also
 List of sheep milk cheeses

References 

French cheeses
Sheep's-milk cheeses